Oidaematophorus constanti is a moth of the family Pterophoridae. It is found on Corsica and Sardinia and in Spain, France, Germany, the Czech Republic, Austria, Slovenia, Slovakia, Hungary, Romania and North Macedonia.

The larvae feed on Inula montana, Inula vaillantii, Inula hellenium, Inula helenioides, Inula oculus christi and ploughman's-spikenard (Inula conyza).

References

Oidaematophorini
Moths described in 1875
Plume moths of Europe
Taxa named by Émile Louis Ragonot